The Quest is an outdoor 1983 sculpture of Alice Biddle by Kirk St. Maur, installed on the Oregon State University campus in Corvallis, Oregon, in the United States.

Description and history
Kirk St. Maur's The Quest (1983) is an outdoor sculpture of Alice Biddle, the first female Oregon State University graduate, installed near Memorial Union. The bronze statue measures approximately  x  x . The Smithsonian Institution's description reads in part, "The figure is standing and her head is turned to the proper right. In her proper right hand, she holds a piece of rolled-up paper depicted in bronze. Both arms are slightly held out from her sides." An inscription on the back of her skirt includes a signed inscription of the artist's name, a copyright symbol, and year of completion. Another inscription on a nearby marker reads, 

The sculpture was commissioned by the Oregon Arts Commission as part of its 1% for Art in State Buildings program. It was surveyed and deemed "treatment needed" by Smithsonian's "Save Outdoor Sculpture!" program in March 1993. The Quest is administered by Oregon State University.

See also
 1983 in art

References

1983 establishments in Oregon
1983 sculptures
Bronze sculptures in Oregon
Monuments and memorials in Corvallis, Oregon
Oregon State University campus
Outdoor sculptures in Corvallis, Oregon
Sculptures of women in Oregon
Statues in Oregon